Groslay station is a rail station located in Groslay, France.  It is on the Épinay-Villetaneuse–Le Tréport-Mers railway. The station is used by Transilien line H trains from Paris to Persan-Beaumont and Luzarches. The daily number of passengers was estimated to be between 500 and 2,000 in 2002.

The line from Épinay to Persan-Beaumont via Montsoult was opened by the Compagnie des chemins de fer du Nord (Nord Railway Company) in 1877.

The station is accessed from Rue Charles de Gaulle. It has a taxi rank and a station car park with 174 parking spaces.

Correspondances

Busval d'Oise: 95.02

References

External links
 

Railway stations in Val-d'Oise
Railway stations in France opened in 1877